Peter Thomas Kelly (born 17 June 1950) is an Irish lawyer who held various judicial roles between 1996 and 2020. He began his career working in the civil service, before becoming a successful barrister. He was first appointed a Judge of the High Court in 1996, having an instrumental role in the establishment of the Commercial Court division of the court in 2004. He was one of the first judges appointed to a new Court of Appeal when it was established in 2014. He returned to the High Court in 2015 on becoming the President of the High Court, a role which he held until retiring in 2020. He was an ex officio member of the Supreme Court of Ireland while President of the High Court.

Early career 

Kelly was born in Dublin in 1950 and attended O'Connell School. Upon leaving school, he worked as a civil servant at the High Court Central Office. He was educated at University College Dublin and the King's Inns. He was called to the Bar in 1973. Kelly then worked in the European Division of the Department of Justice in Brussels and Luxembourg until he commenced practice in 1975. He was also called to the Bar of England and Wales and the Bar of Northern Ireland in 1981 and 1983 respectively.

He became a Senior Counsel in 1986. He primarily practised in commercial and chancery law, though he also acted in constitutional law cases. He represented Fianna Fáil politician Des Hanafin in a case seeking to have Fifteenth Amendment of the Constitution of Ireland, permitting divorce, declared to be unconstitutional. The Supreme Court appointed him to argue for the right of the unborn in a reference made by President Mary Robinson under Article 26 of the Constitution of Ireland to the Supreme Court regarding the Information (Termination of Pregnancies) Bill 1995.

Kelly acted for families of the victims Stardust fire seeking compensation from the Stardust Victims Compensation Tribunal in 1986. Other clients over the course of his career included the Aga Khan and Ben Dunne.

He is a bencher at the King's Inns since 1996 and Middle Temple since 2014.

Early judicial career

High Court 

Kelly was appointed a Judge of the High Court in 1996 at the age of 46. He was the judge-in-charge of the Chancery List between 1997 and 1999 and the Judicial Review List between 1999 and 2003.

Early in his career as a High Court judge he clashed with the government over the treatment of vulnerable young people. In 2000 he put in place a mandatory injunction requiring government ministers to provide specialist support care for underage patient. This provoked controversy with the government as if not followed, it would have held the relevant minister in contempt of court. An appeal to the Supreme Court of his decision was subsequently upheld.

He became the first president of the Association of Judges of Ireland in 2011. In 2013, he accused the then government of taking apart the legal system "brick by brick".

Commercial Court 
He was appointed as the presiding judge over a newly established Commercial Court within the High Court in 2004 to hear cases which were complex or with a claim in excess of €1 million. The structure of the court came about following rules which he proposed to the Superior Court Rules Committee and were accepted by the Minister for Justice. It was launched in October 2004.

Kelly continued to preside over the court throughout the Post-2008 Irish economic downturn. He heard high profile cases arising out of the economic crash including cases involving Anglo Irish Bank, Seán Quinn, Mick Wallace and ACC Bank. He awarded a €2.2 billion judgment against Quinn. Kelly said that while presiding over the Commercial Court he witnessed "national and international fraud, sharp practice, chicanery and dishonesty".

Court of Appeal 
The establishment of the Court of Appeal led to his appointment in October 2014 as one of the first six ordinary judges of the court.

President of the High Court 
He was appointed as President of the High Court on 21 December 2015. By virtue of his position, he is also a member of the Supreme Court of Ireland. Upon his appointment, the Director General of the Law Society of Ireland described him as a "fearlessly independent judge with a ferocious work ethic" and said he had a "first-class legal mind".

Kelly was the Acting President of the Court of Appeal for a period in 2016 while Sean Ryan was on medical leave. The Irish Times reported that he was one of three judges considered for the role of Chief Justice of Ireland upon the retirement of Susan Denham in 2017, though only Frank Clarke's name was put forward for selection by the cabinet.

As President, he introduced greater safeguards for the ward of court process, re-introducing independent medical visitors. 

He retired on 17 June 2020 upon reaching the mandatory retirement age of 70. He received a guard of honour from judicial colleagues in lieu of a traditional ceremony, due to COVID-19 concerns. At the time of his retirement, he was the second-longest serving Irish judge. Mícheál O’Higgins, then President of the Bar Council, praised what he considered Kelly's "competence, rigour, propriety and independence".

Further appointments 

Kelly is an adjunct professor of law at Maynooth University, serves on the Council of the Royal College of Surgeons in Ireland. He is chairman of the Edmund Rice Schools Trust and St. Francis Hospice, Raheny. In June 2022 he was sworn in as judge of the court of appeal of the Dubai International Financial Centre (DIFC) courts but resigned a few days later following criticism from barrister and Labour Party leader, Ivana Bacik.

Personal life 
Kelly lives in south Dublin. He also has a residence in Rome. He is a practising Catholic.

References

1950 births
Living people
Alumni of University College Dublin
Presidents of the High Court (Ireland)
Irish Senior Counsel
Judges of the Court of Appeal (Ireland)
21st-century Irish judges
20th-century Irish judges
Alumni of King's Inns
20th-century Irish civil servants